Tierra is an American Latin R&B band, originally from Los Angeles, California, United States, that was first established in 1972 by former El Chicano members Rudy Salas (guitar) and his brother Steve Salas (vocals).  The other original members were  Bobby Loya , Bobby Navarrete (reeds), Joey Guerra (keyboards), Steve Falomir (bass guitar), Philip Madayag (drums), and Andre Baeza (percussion). Their biggest hit was the 1980 remake of The Intruders' 1967 hit "Together", written by Gamble & Huff, which reached No. 18 on the Billboard Hot 100, and No. 9 on the US Billboard R&B chart. It was a number one record on Los Angeles radio.

Background
Tierra has the distinction of being the first Latino band to have four songs on the national chart, with two of them in the Top 100 at the same time.

In 1972, Rudy and Steve Salas formed Tierra and their self-titled debut album was recorded. By the mid-1970s the band consisted of the Salas brothers, Rudy Villa on reeds, Kenny Román on drums and Latin-percussion, Conrad Lozano on bass, Aaron Ballesteros on drums and vocals, Alfred Rubalcava on bass and Leon Bisquera on keyboards. Around that time they recorded the album Stranded for the Salsoul records label.

In 1980, they had a platinum hit with their version of "Together" which was a remake of the 1967 song by The Intruders. The song which was written by Gamble & Huff, reached No. 18 on the Billboard Hot 100, No. 30 on the Adult Contemporary chart, and No. 9 on the US Billboard R&B chart. A few months later they had another chart hit with "Memories". Later in the year they charted again with "La La Means I Love You".

In 1981, in an interview with the Los Angeles Times Rudy Salas was quoted as saying "Sometimes I couldn't feed my family, I'm going out to get a legitimate job." At those bleak moments, his then wife Martha Salas would intervene. "She would talk me out of it," Salas said. "She knows how I love music. She would tell me, "No way you're gonna quit, you'd just take it out on me and the kids and we'd all be miserable." "She was right".

In 1995, they released their A New Beginning album.

Around 1997, younger brother Steve supposedly quit the band after disputes over leadership of the band, money and management. In an interview he claimed that he was fired by his brother Rudy. He formed his own band and for a period of time there were two bands bearing the name Tierra. The Tierra band led by Steve Salas was booked for three nights at the Conga Room. Rudy Salas's wife Joanna Alvarado Salas contacted the club to inform them that the real Tierra was the one fronted by her husband. This led to the club's booking manager Robert Vargas getting into negotiations and mediating between the two brothers, with a plan to have a band consisting of the two brothers and as many members as possible from their successful years in the early 1980s. An argument developed over the line up, and Steve Salas backed out two weeks before the concert was to take place. He then apologized, and in January 2002, they were booked to play the Conga Room.

Recent years
Their album On Solid Ground was released in 2013.  They appeared on Kid Frost's 2001 CD, Still Up in This Shit!, performing a new version of The Notations' "I'm Still Here".

Band member Isaac Avila died at age 49 of a brain hemorrhage on August 30, 2009. Johnny "The Stick" Valenzuela died some time between 2010 and 2013. Bassist Steve Falomir died due to a stroke on January 21, 2012  in Los Angeles. Rudy Salas died from COVID-19 on December 29, 2020, at age 72. Steve Salas died on February 10, 2022, at the age of 70 after a two-year battle myeloma and also contracting COVID-19 in the time leading up to his death.

Associated act: DW3 aka Down With Three, that consists of Billy Mondragon (former lead singer of Tierra), Damon Montelongo, and Eric Mondragon.

Band members

1973 lineup
 Rudy Salas - Band leader, guitar
 Andre Baeza - percussion
 Joey Guerra - keyboards
 Steve Falomir - bass
 Philip Madayag - drums
 Bobby Navarrete - sax, reeds
 Rudy Villa - saxes, flute
 David Torres - keyboards, trumpet, flute
 Kenny Roman - drums
 Steve Salas - lead singer

Other Past Members
 Isaac Campos Avila - lead vocals, guitar
 Mike Jimenez - lead vocals
 Billy Mondragon - lead vocals
 Conrad Lozano - bass
 David Torres - keyboards
 Aaron Ballesteros - drums
 Johnny "The Stick" Valenzuela - percussion<ref>JazzTimes January / February 1998 Various Artists, Latin Legends Live By Marcela Breton </ref>
 Danny Santillan - drums
 Leon Bisquera - keyboards
 Joey Navarro, keyboards, background vocals) 
 Dale Villavicencio - percussion

Current Members, 2022
 Rudy "Bub" Villa (Tierra original member from 1971, saxophone, vocals) 32 years.
 Victor Cisneros (saxophone, vocals) 32 years, since 1990.
 Jeff Lewis (trumpet, background vocals) 23 years, since 1999.
 Will Rize Riverra (lead vocals) 10 years, since 2012.
 Tony Banda (bass) 10 years, since 2012.
 Roger Rivas (keyboards) 19 years, 1987 to 2005, then since 2021.
 Mario Quiroga (guitar, vocals) 1 year, since 2021.

DiscographyTierra (20th Century Records, 1973)Stranded (Salsoul Records, 1975)City Nights (Boardwalk Records, 1980)Together Again (Boardwalk Records, 1981)Bad City Boys (Boardwalk Records, 1982)A New Beginning (Fiesta Records, 1989)Tonight (Thump Records, 1993)Street Corner Gold (Thump Records, 1995)Greatest Hits (Thump Records, 2000)Two Worlds - Dos Mundos (Thump Records, 2001)Welcome to Cafe East L.A. (Thump Records, 2005)The Rare Collection (I.T.P. Records, 2005)Greatest Love Songs (Thump Records, 2007)On the Right Track (M & M Records, 2008)On Solid Ground (M & M Records 2013)Ya Llego'' (2017)

References

External links
Official website
 

1973 establishments in California
American musicians of Mexican descent
American rhythm and blues musical groups
Musical groups established in 1973
Chicano rock musicians
Musical groups from Los Angeles
Rock music groups from California